The 1974–75 Ashes series consisted of six cricket Test matches, each match lasted five days with six hours of play each day and eight ball overs. It formed part of the MCC tour of Australia in 1974–75 and the matches outside the Tests were played in the name of the Marylebone Cricket Club. Ian Chappell's Australians won the series 4–1 and "brutally and unceremoniously wrenched the Ashes" from Mike Denness's England team. It was Australia's first series victory over England for ten years and the experience proved popular as 777,563 spectators came through the gates and paid nearly a million Australian dollars for the privilege. For the first time the first day of the Third Test at Melbourne was held on Boxing Day in an Ashes series, now a cricketing tradition.

Chappell's team was labelled the "ugly Australians" thanks to his hard-nosed captaincy, intimidatory fast bowling and constant sledging as "Rod Marsh and his captain Ian Chappell would vie with each other in profanity". Dennis Lillee had injured his back in 1973, but now returned to Test cricket with 25 wickets at an average of 23.94, but the real surprise was Jeff Thomson whose javelin throw bowling action generated exceptional pace and rearing bouncers that gave him 33 wickets (17.93). Wisden reported that "never in the 98 years of Test cricket have batsmen been so grievously bruised and battered by ferocious, hostile, short-pitched balls". They received generous support from the fast-medium bowler Max Walker with 23 wickets (29.73) and the off-spinner Ashley Mallett with 17 wickets (19.94) as Australia won four of the first five Tests. Greg Chappell had already established himself as a world class batsman and cemented his reputation with 608 runs at an average of 55.27 and a record 14 catches. The opener Ian Redpath spent over 32 hours at the crease for his 472 runs (42.90) and Doug Walters became the first batsman to make an Ashes century in a single session since Don Bradman. The Australian fielding was exceptional as "almost everything that left the ground was caught and ... had a swallow flown within reach of the Australian fieldsmen ... it would have done so at its own risk".

The England batsmen were battered and bruised to such an extent that in one game a local player was used to make up an XI. The 41-year-old Colin Cowdrey was sent to reinforce the team on his record sixth tour of Australia and opened the England innings in the second Test at Perth a few days after his arrival and without any match practice. Denness's form deserted him for most of the tour and he became the first captain to drop himself from a Test match, but returned to make 188 and win the Sixth Test by an innings, the highest score by an England captain in Australia.

Umpiring

Ian Chappell ... made it clear more than once that he regarded the control of his side on the field as the concern solely of the umpires. Poor wretched men! I wonder what Ian thought might have happened if either Tom Brooks or Robin Bailhache had applied the full sanction of Law 46, and had banned either Lillee or Thomson on that emotion-charged Sunday afternoon. How many beer-cans might have bespattered the field, and angry spectators invaded the playing area? As it was the umpires contented themselves with friendly warnings afterwards described as 'unofficial'. In the circumstances it was hard to blame them.
E.W. Swanton
The umpires in all six Tests were Tom Brooks, who had made his debut four years previously in 1970–71, and Robin Bailhache, who made his debut in the First Test at Brisbane. Brooks had been a fast-medium bowler for New South Wales and was forgiving of short-pitched deliveries which he saw as a natural part of the game. This helped England in 1970–71 when they had the fast bowlers John Snow and Bob Willis, but not in 1974–75. The only real point of contention in the series was the intimidatory bowling, particularly by Dennis Lillee and Jeff Thomson of Australia, but also Bob Willis, Tony Greig and Peter Lever of England. As the series progressed the touring team and English press thought that the Australian umpires failed to apply Law 46; 'The persistent bowling of fast short-pitched balls at the batsman is unfair if, in the opinion of the umpire at the bowler's end, it constitutes a systematic attempt at intimidation'. Traditionally it was the job of the captain to restrain his bowlers if they became too aggressive, but Ian Chappell refused to do so and the Australian umpires were loath to give them official warnings. To be fair Chappell "employed almost the identical tactics used by Illingworth and Snow in 1970–71". Keith Fletcher and John Edrich (twice each), Dennis Amiss, David Lloyd, Colin Cowdrey and Fred Titmus of England and Wally Edwards, Dennis Lillee, Ashley Mallett and Greg Chappell of Australia were all injured while batting in the series. However, the umpires were willing to give the batsmen the benefit of bad light several times, particularly if Lillee, Thomson or Willis were bowling. In the First Test at Brisbane Bailhache told Lillee and Thomson to stop bowling short, but they did not and he offered the England openers the benefit of the bad light. As a result, Ian Chappell complained about the umpire's interference as it was not his job to tell his team how to bowl, Frank Tyson agreeing.

First Test – Brisbane

Preliminaries
For when Mike Denness and his side went to the ground on the Wednesday morning, two days before the First Test, the pitch to their astonishment was a morass of black mud. They left the acting-curator and reigning Lord Mayor of Brisbane, Clem Jones, clad in a yellow safety-helmet flattening it, roughly speaking, with a heavy motor-roller...Clem Jones is a regular Pooh-Bah whose energies are said to have accomplished much for the city of Brisbane; but as Michael Melford put it in  The Daily Telegraph 'civic duties and curatorship do not easily blend.'
E.W. Swanton

Brisbane Tests were traditionally hit by torrential rain and in 1974–75 it fell heavily in the week before the match. The Lord-Mayor of Brisbane, Alderman Clem Jones, sacked the curator at the Gabba so that he could prepare the Test wicket himself. Jones had recently been dethroned as Queensland's representative in the Australian Board of Control, but was still influential in the Queensland Cricket Association. He was a hands-on manager who even manned the turnstiles when he saw the need and had prepared wickets before, but not at Test level. His efforts were not helped by the downpour which turned the ground into sludge, and he admitted that the Test wicket "was a bit crook at one end". However, the scorching Queensland sun and an army of staff working day and night dried out the ground and Jones discarded the muddy wicket for the one used in the Queensland-Western Australia state game. E.W. Swanton thought that over use of the heavy roller on the soft ground had created a ridge at the Vulture Street end, producing uneven bounce, but Frank Tyson noted that only Lillee and Thomson were able to get the ball to rise above stump height and that it only became unpredictable on the last day.

Australia had several series wins behind them and the selectors Sam Loxton, Neil Harvey and Phil Ridings picked the regulars; the batsmen Ian Chappell, Greg Chappell (despite recovering from influenza), Ian Redpath and Doug Walters, wicketkeeper Rod Marsh, fast bowler Max Walker and leg-spinner Kerry O'Keeffe. The fast bowler Dennis Lillee had demonstrated his fitness after his crippling back injury of 1973 and was brought back into the team along with the surprise choice of Jeff Thomson, an inaccurate fast bowler with a slinging, javelin throw action. His sheer pace would be the deciding factor in the series, though many pundits thought the left-arm Geoff Dymock would have been the better bet. The leg-spinner Terry Jenner was another surprise as Brisbane was not conductive to spin, but in the end the regular spinner Kerry O'Keeffe was made twelfth man and Jenner played in his stead. Wally Edwards and Ross Edwards were brought over from Western Australia. Wally was an angular opening batsman in the style of Bill Lawry and Ross had made his name by scoring 170 not out at Trent Bridge in the 1972 Ashes series.

England had left their best batsman Geoff Boycott and best bowler John Snow at home, but were still able to present a professional-looking team which had lost only one of its last eleven Tests. The tour selectors Alec Bedser, Alan Smith, Mike Denness, John Edrich and Tony Greig were slightly hampered by rain-affected practice matches and a line of niggling injuries; David Lloyd was out with a broken finger, Geoff Arnold with a strained shoulder and Chris Old with an injured hand. The captain Denness had just recovered from a mystery virus, Edrich from a back injury and Dennis Amiss and Bob Willis had thrown off groin strains. However, they had beaten New South Wales and were the first MCC team to beat Queensland since the war. Boycott's replacement Brian Luckhurst was chosen to open with Amiss, followed by the batsmen Edrich, Denness, Keith Fletcher, Greig, the wicketkeeper Alan Knott, the spinner Derek Underwood and the fast bowlers Willis, Mike Hendrick and Peter Lever.

Ian Chappell won the toss and elected to bat on the suspect surface. Though it is a brave captain who puts the opposition in to bat Chappell had a difficult decision as the wicket could dry out into a good batting surface later in the match, though the prevailing opinion was that it would be better not to bat last on an under-prepared wicket.

Australia – First Innings
A retrospective analysis of the Australian batting performance revealed that the recognised bats, other than the two Chappells and Edwards had reduced the art to technical absurdity; whereas the tail-enders has distilled it to simplicity. The scoresheet disclosed that no fewer than six batsmen lost their wickets hooking and pulling.
Frank Tyson

Bob Willis opened the bowling with a stiff breeze behind him, but Peter Lever found it too much going into the wind and Mike Hendrick (2/64) replaced him after one over. Hendrick got Wally Edwards to mis-hook a short ball to a tumbling Dennis Amiss. At the other end Ian Redpath was backing away to leg to avoid Willis's bouncers, but exposed his off-stump and was yorked for 5, leaving Australia 10/2. The Chappell brothers recovered the innings with a stand of 100 runs in 155 minutes with Denness rotating his bowlers every four overs so they could rest. Ian Chappell was out of form and took 97 minutes to make 11 runs, but after lunch the fast bowlers were replaced by Tony Greig, who suffered as the brothers took advantage of his poor length. In the end it was Derek Underwood who dismissed Greg Chappell for 58 with the best ball of the day, a leg-spinner which clipped the edge of his bat and was taken by Keith Fletcher at slip. The Australian captain started arguing with Greig as the lanky bowler's footmarks were in line with the stumps and obliterating Chappell's block mark. Greig kept scuffing the block mark to even the ground so he would not trip and Chappell kept re-marking his block until they looked like schoolboys kicking dirt at each other. Chappell built up another partnership of 87 with Ross Edwards until the captain reached 90, decided to attack the bowling in the last hour of play and hooked Willis (4/56) into the hands of Greig, soon followed by Doug Walters who hooked him to Lever. Edwards was caught behind by another deadly delivery from Underwood (2/54) and 197/3 became 205/6 and 216/6 at stumps. The overnight batsmen Rod Marsh and Terry Jenner had to face Willis with the new ball and Jenner mis-hooked him to square-leg, where Lever ran 22 yards to take the catch. Marsh was beaten by Hendrick's swing and was caught by Denness to leave Australia 228/8 and in real trouble when they were saved by a wagging tail. The 6'4" Max Walker started swinging the bat for 41 not out and added 29 with Dennis Lillee, who fell over trying to hook a medium-paced bouncer from Greig (1/70) and gloved the ball to the wicketkeeper Alan Knott, who had missed a chance off Walker at 242/8. After Lillee had given Greig a few words of discouragement and walked off Jeff Thomson hit 23 and added 52 runs for the last wicket until he was run out by a brilliant pick up and throw from the England captain and Australia were all out for 309.

England – First Innings
I hadn't witnessed the full, frightening pace of Jeff Thomson until the First Test of the 1974–75 series against England. Rod Marsh, playing for W.A., had. 'He's bloody quick!' was Rod's verdict...There was a stiff breeze and I thought Max might use the new ball better. Maybe curiosity influenced me, but I gave the ball to Thommo. His first over was quick...I was standing beside Marsh as the ball thudded into his gloves. He tossed the ball to Greg Chappell at second slip –  and wrung his hands. 'Something wrong, pal?' I asked. 'Christ, that hurt,' said Marsh. 'But I love it.'
Ian Chappell

Dennis Lillee opened the Australian bowling with the help of the wind and was a yard faster than Willis, but Jeff Thomson bowling into the wind was faster still and made the opening batsmen Brian Luckhurst and Dennis Amiss flinch from the ball leaping off the pitch towards their bodies. Luckhurst edged a catch behind to Rod Marsh and Amiss to Terry Jenner in the gully and England were 10/2 just as Australia had been, with Thomson (3/59) receiving enthusiastic applause from his new home crowd. The England vice-captain John Edrich dug himself in and fought off the short-pitched deliveries which battered his body and hands. His captain Mike Denness padded up to a ball that landed outside his off-stump and cut back under the new leg before wicket law which meant he could be out if the umpire was satisfied that the ball would hit the wicket even if it pitched outside the line of the stumps. Keith Fletcher was severely bruised on his forearm and fended off a couple of balls that landed just beyond the reach of Ian Redpath at short-leg. Thomson had now switched ends and with the wind behind him was bowling at extraordinary speed, Fletcher once edging the ball over the slips that almost went for six. After Doug Walters and Jenner had given him a rest Lillee (2/73) returned to bowl Fletcher, who cut the ball onto his stumps and England were 57/4. The Edrich family were well known for their tenacity and Tony Greig used his long reach to slash the short stuff over the head of the Australian slip and gully fieldsmen. As a result, they saw out the day with the score on 114/4. Strangely Ian Chappell did not ask for the wicket to be rolled at the start of the second day and neither did Denness at the start of the third. Edrich started the day making 2,000 runs against Australia, the seventh man to do so after Jack Hobbs, Wally Hammond, Herbert Sutcliffe, Len Hutton, Colin Cowdrey and Ken Barrington. Immediately afterwards Greig was dropped by Jenner off Lillee and Edrich, whose hand was so swollen from a bone broken on the previous day that he could barely hold his bat, edged Thomson to Ian Chappell at first slip for 48. Max Walker (4/73) was now bowling into the wind with the new ball and dismissed Alan Knott and Peter Lever, but "Greig started slashing the ball all over the place on his way to a century and Underwood's nagging straight bat was defying everything we threw at him. Lillee, Thomson, Walker, Jenner...then through them all again." Greig (110) and Derek Underwood (25) added 58 for the eighth wicket when Chappell called on Doug Walters to break the partnership. The ball slipped from Walters hand and wafted towards Underwood, who was so used to the pace of Lillee and Thomson that he mistimed his stroke and gave a simple catch to Redpath in the covers for 228/8. Greig hit his 17th boundary then gave a fine edge to Marsh from Lillee at 248/9, the first England batsmen to make a century in Brisbane since Maurice Leyland in 1936–37, also the last time England had won at the venue. Bob Willis and Mike Hendrick added 17 runs for the last wicket until the latter gave a catch to Redpath off Walker and England were out for 265, 44 runs behind Australia.

Australia – Second Innings
To watch every ball of the 1974/75 Ashes battle was to see excitement and controversy at its height in the game of cricket: an Australian fast-bowling pair to rank with the greatest ever to pull on a pair of boots, catching the equal or better of anything I have seen in Test cricket, batting and captaincy to match anything Australian sides have produced since the war.
Richie Benaud

There was a considerable difference between the two Australian innings: six batsmen had lost their wicket hooking the ball in the first innings and this stroke was ignored in the second as Ian Chappell told his men to stay in. This cost them the initiative as it took 150 minutes to reach 51/2, with only 8 runs scored off the last 12 8-ball overs. The batsmen to fall were Wally Edwards, who was caught by Alan Knott off Bob Willis (3/45), and Ian Chappell who prodded a ball to Keith Fletcher off Derek Underwood (2/60). On the fourth day Ian Redpath was bowled again by Willis to leave Australia 59/3, but after this Greg Chappell (71), Ross Edwards (53), Doug Walters (63 not out) and Rod Marsh (46 not out) set about extending the lead. Chappell and Edwards added 114, without getting away from the tight bowling and defensive fields and Knott took his 174th Test catch off Willis to dismiss Edwards, thus breaking Godfrey Evans's 15-year-old record. It took some robust strokeplay from Walters and Marsh to bring the score to 288/5 in under 8 hours, Marsh hitting Underwood for a four and a six off successive balls before being dropped by the substitute Chris Old in the outfield and Walters hitting the 100,000th run for Australia against England on 199/5. Chappell declared 45 minutes before stumps to give England 335 minutes to make 333 runs to win, carefully timed to prevent a repeat of their shock win over the West Indies after a sporting declaration by Gary Sobers in 1967–68.

England – Second Innings
Lindsay Hassett ... said he thought an over bowled by Thomson at Brisbane was the best he had ever seen from a fast bowler.
E.W. Swanton

Though there was 35 minutes for England to bat until stumps they survived with 10/0 as a stormcloud loomed over the ground. Dennis Lillee and Jeff Thomson were sending down three short balls an over and umpire Bailhache told them they should bowl fuller, but the next ball was a Thomson bouncer and the umpire gave the English batsmen the benefit of the bad light. Ian Chappell complained about the umpire's interference as strictly speaking he could not tell the bowlers what to bowl and the ABC commentator Frank Tyson agreed. Brian Luckhurst edged Lillee (2/25) to Ian Chappell early the next morning leaving Dennis Amiss and John Edrich to bat, both of whom had broken bones in their hands from the first innings. Edrich took pain-killing injections in the drinks break, but was plainly out of sorts and was bowled by Thomson (6/46). Amiss received a brute of a ball from Thomson that he sent to Doug Walters at third slip. This brought Mike Denness and Keith Fletcher together at 40/3 and they resisted for an hour when the captain was taken by Walters off another Thomson thunderbolt, soon followed by Fletcher, caught by Greg Chappell off Terry Jenner (2/45). Tony Greig had come to the crease at 92/4, and much depended on a repeat of his first innings heroics, but he was dismissed for just two runs, by a yorker from Thomson. There was little hope of England lasting the day, but Alan Knott held out for two hours making 19, adding 29 with Peter Lever and 47 with the top-scorer Derek Underwood (30). When Underwood fell at 162/8, Knott and Hendrick soon followed and England were all out for 166 to lose by 166 runs, 84 minutes short of saving the game.

Thomson took 6/46, which remained the best Test figures of his career. "Bowling at ferocious speed he claimed 6 for 46 - the highlight a searing yorker that removed first innings century-maker Tony Greig for 2."

Result
The unpleasant truth for England after Brisbane was that every curator at every Test ground would be seeking to quicken their pitches. There would be no respite from pace. There was no running to the medium pace end for a breather. We had seen the birth of a new pace partnership which can be as effective as Lindwall and Miller. The past demonstrated that these are the types of bowlers who win Test matches.
Frank Tyson

Australia won the First Test by 166 runs to take a 1–0 lead in the series. Worse for them Dennis Amiss, John Edrich and David Lloyd had broken hands, Keith Fletcher a badly bruised arm, Bob Willis a groin strain and Peter Lever had injured a side muscle. Before they left Brisbane the tour selectors sent back to London for a replacement batsmen and asked for the 41-year-old Colin Cowdrey. Cowdrey was highly regarded by the MCC team and in particular by Mike Denness, who had succeeded him as captain of Kent. In his 20-year Test career he had faced the fast bowling of Keith Miller, Ray Lindwall, Wes Hall, Charlie Griffith, Ian Meckiff, Gordon Rorke, Neil Adcock and even the young Dennis Lillee. Although the Australian press was aghast at such a recall – Cowdrey had not played a Test in four years – the tourists were keen to have a man with the technique and strength of purpose to play the fastest of bowlers. The attendance over the five days was a record 62,000, easily beating the old one of 42,000 as the facilities at the Gabba had been greatly improved over the wooden stands and barbed wire 'concentration camp' of yesteryears.

Second Test – Perth

Preliminaries
My father toured Australia six times (in 1954/5, 1958/9, 1962/3, 1965/6, 1970/1 and 1974/5) with immense success, winning friends everywhere. You have probably seen a photograph of the banner hung at the MCG, that tribute to him from his Australian fans. People still talk of his hundred in Melbourne on his first tour, and his highest first-class score, 307 at Adelaide. Six times he toured, being good enough at 20 and good enough at 40.
Chris Cowdrey

Colin Cowdrey arrived in Perth with the wives of the MCC team after a 19-hour delay in Bombay, too late to play a practice match and he was called up for the Second Test two days after he arrived and with three hours in the nets. This was his sixth tour of Australia matching the record of the Lancashire spinner Johnny Briggs. Frank Tyson, who had played with Cowdrey in the 1954–55 Ashes series and now commentating for the ABC was jokingly asked by fans if he would be recalled as well. The tour selectors were limited by the hand injuries to John Edrich and Dennis Amiss, but David Lloyd's finger had mended and he was called up to open the innings. Fletcher had a numb forearm after being hit by a Lillee bouncer in Brisbane and again by Alan Smith in the nets and was 'absent hurt' in the match against Western Australia, but had now recovered and kept his place. Peter Lever had a side strain and Mike Hendrick a fever and they were replaced by Chris Old and Geoff Arnold. More surprisingly Derek Underwood was replaced by the veteran Fred Titmus. Underwood had bowled some excellent balls in the First Test, but the WACA was a fast, true pitch with little turn and Titmus's ability to flight the ball was seen as an advantage, and his all-round ability would strengthen the fragile batting line up. The task of the Australian selectors was easier as they kept the same XI from Brisbane, but exchanged the twelfth man Kerry O'Keeffe for the off-spinner Ashley Mallett. Like Titmus Mallett was able to flight the ball, so Terry Jenner was made twelfth man and Mallett played. Ian Chappell won the toss and took the extraordinary decision to field, believing that the England batsmen were still demoralised from their experience at Brisbane and that a dose of fast bowling on the quickest pitch in Australia might break them. Also there was some moisture in the air which would help his swing bowlers. Only twice had a captain put the opposition into bat and won in Australia, Johnny Douglas in the Fourth Test of the 1911–12 Ashes series and Richie Benaud in the Fifth Test of the 1958–59 Ashes series, both at the MCG.

England – First Innings
"Mr Thomson, I believe? How good to meet you."
Colin Cowdrey
"That's not going to help you fatso, piss off."
Jeff Thomson

Initially it looked like Ian Chappell's plan to put England in to bat had backfired. Though Jeff Thomson made the ball bounce over Brian Luckhurst's head on several occasions, the Kent batsmen was 'smitten hip and thigh' and had a bone broken in his hand, but he and David Lloyd saw off the new ball and added 44 for the first wicket. Luckhurst now decided to make some runs and was caught in the gully by Ashley Mallett trying to drive Max Walker (2/49). Colin Cowdrey now walked to the crease to an ovation from the 16,000 crowd at the WACA, but not from Thomson when he arrived at the crease. He showed that he has lost none of his timing and that his bat was as straight as ever. Lloyd (44) took 10 runs off Mallett's first over and England were 99/1 when he slashed a ball off Thomson into the gully where Greg Chappell took a sharp catch. England now collapsed to 132/6; Cowdrey was bowled behind his legs by Thomson (2/45) for 22, Keith Fletcher was beaten by Dennis Lillee and edged the ball to Ian Redpath in the slips, Mike Denness edged another ball off Lillee (2/48) to Greg Chappell also in the slips, Tony Greig repeated his slashing tactics of Brisbane, but smashed the ball into Mallett's stomach off Walker and was out. Alan Knott set about restoring the decision, making 51 out of 62 added with Fred Titmus in 70 minutes. Doug Walters (2/13) broke the partnership by having both batsmen caught by Redpath and the tail folded. Greg Chappell dived to knock a well struck ball from Chris Old off Ian Chappell's leg-spin and caught it on the second try and Geoff Arnold was run out by Walters and Marsh. England were dismissed for 208 a few minutes before stumps and Australia were on top.

Australia – First Innings
Doug Walters went to the wicket when Australia's total stood at 4/192 just before tea and played his shots to such telling effect that, by the time stumps arrived, he had scored 103...He opened the dressing-room door, expecting a flood of congratulations from his fellow players on the brilliance of his stroke play. His team mates, however, had anticipated Walters' expectations and were hidden in the shower room. Ian Chappell, the Aussie skipper, was alone in the room, hunched over a newspaper crossword. Chappell looked up as Walters entered, well ahead of his fellow batsmen. 'What the hell are you doing back here? I told you not to get out tonight'...
Frank Tyson

Ian Redpath and Wally Edwards saw off the new ball and were 1/0 at stumps on the first day. The next day Bob Willis (2/91) hit Edwards with a bouncer and appealed for Redpath caught behind off his gloves, which was declined by the umpire. They took the score to 64 runs in less than an hour when Edwards hit Tony Greig to David Lloyd at cover-point. The usually static Redpath was stumped when he danced down the wicket to Fred Titmus (2/84) and Ian Chappell edged Geoff Arnold (2/129) to Alan Knott while trying to leg glance, leaving Australia 113/3. Greg Chappell made 62, his fifth successive 50 against the tourists and added 79 runs with Ross Edwards by tea, though Titmus conceded only 20 runs in nine 8-ball overs. Chappell was out at 192/4 when he cut Willis into the gully where Colin Cowdrey knocked the ball up to be caught by Greig. After tea Doug Walters came out and took command of the game as Denness declined to use Willis to attack his well-known weakness around the off stump. Instead Greig sent up his slow off-cutters and gave away 69 runs off nine overs. Walters reached his 50 in 44 minutes, followed by that of Edwards in 174 minutes. The English fielding became ragged as they added 158 runs after tea. Walters reached his century off the last ball of the day by pulling Willis for six and was engulfed by fans as he left the field, as well they might as he was the first batsman since Bradman to score a hundred runs in a session in an Ashes Test. Australia were 352/4 and well ahead in the game, but the Australian team played a trick on Walters when he returned, hiding in the showers before coming out to congratulate him. He was out first thing the next day, caught by Fletcher in the gully off Willis waving his bat outside off-stump for 103, but Edwards stayed in to make 115, having been 79 overnight and became the first Western Australian to make a hundred at the WACA. He was bowled by Arnold, but Rod Marsh hit 41 and the tail added 65 runs before Chris Old cleared things up with 3/85. Australia made 481, a lead of 273 in the first innings and few thought England could avoid an innings defeat.

England – Second Innings
Truthfully, I enjoy hitting a batsman more than getting him out. It doesn't worry me in the least to see the batsman hurt, rolling around screaming and blood on the pitch.
Jeff Thomson

With Brian Luckhurst injured Colin Cowdrey volunteered to open the innings with David Lloyd and withstood the wild first overs of Dennis Lillee (2/59) and Jeff Thomson (5/93). So many of the balls were short that only two or three had to be played each over and runmaking came slowly as the batsmen concentrated on survival. Lloyd was caught in the box by a bouncer from Thomson that failed to rise, doubled up in pain for five minutes and was helped off by the England physiotherapist Bernie Thomas. Cowdrey was dropped by Ian Redpath off Lillee, hit on the arm, survived a confident appeal by Rod Marsh before he was finally caught lbw by Thomson for 41, the bowler's 50th first class wicket, with the score 62/1. Mike Denness had replaced Lloyd and despite Doug Walters' low expectations, "Oh Christ, don't tell me we have to put up with that Mike Denness for a couple of balls again", he and Tony Greig lasted the day with his team on 102/1. After a rest day the innings resumed in 37 °C heat on the fourth day, but the game was effectively over when four wickets fell in the first hour. Greig repeated his slashing policy of the First Test until he was caught by Greg Chappell off Thomson. He was replaced by Lloyd who saw Denness edge the same bowler to Redpath, then Fletcher to Marsh to give him 3/8 in three overs. Greg Chappell caught Knott and Lloyd, Luckhurst came out to bat with his broken hand, but was caught by Mallett off Lillee after a stand of 63 with the gallant Fred Titmus (61). With nothing to lose Chris Old thrashed 2 sixes and 5 fours, taking 20 runs off one over from Max Walker and making 43 of the 64 runs added with Titmus for the eight wicket, which ensured that Australia would have to bat again. Geoff Arnold was Thomson's fifth victim and Greg Chappell took Titmus off Mallett (2/32) to give him a seven catches in a Test, breaking the record for a fielder held by his grandfather Vic Richardson amongst others. England made 293, forcing Australia to make 21 runs for victory.

Australia – Second Innings
Ironically, England whose fielding had been so lacklustre in the Australian first innings pulled out all the stops in the second, when they had no chance of winning. Geoff Arnold appealed for lbw against Wally Edwards on his first two balls, and was successful the second time round, but Ian Chappell and Ian Redpath made the necessary runs to end the match with 23/1.

Result
Australia won the Second Test by 9 wickets to take a 2–0 lead in the series. It was the first time that Australia had won two Tests in a series against England since 1961 and the first time that they had been 2–0 up against the old enemy since 1958–59.

Third Test – Melbourne

Preliminaries
Colin Cowdrey and John Edrich were unable to practice on Christmas Eve – mainly because of the drizzling rain but also because Cowdrey wanted to spend his birthday in comparative peace. Since both batsmen wanted to feel the ball on bat before the Test, I volunteered the use of the Hawthorn Indoor Cricket Centre, in which I was a partner, for a two-hour work-out on Christmas morning. It was quite a contrast to open the children's presents in the early hours and to open the bowling at the two English batsmen before lunch. My fifteen old son, Philip, thought the latter experience to be quite the best of his Christmas presents.
Frank Tyson

By long tradition the Victoria–New South Wales Sheffield Shield match began on Boxing Day at the MCG, much to the chagrin of the NSW players who missed Christmas with their families as a result. But with six Tests to fit into the season this game was moved and the Third Test was held instead, thus beginning the current tradition of the Boxing Day Test in Melbourne. Australia kept an unchanged team from Perth, but the England team had a few changes. Dennis Amiss and John Edrich had recovered enough to play again after having their hands broken in the First Test at Brisbane, though Edrich's hand was still sore. The out of form Brian Luckhurst and Keith Fletcher were dropped to make room. Geoff Arnold and Chris Old were also dropped as the now fit Mike Hendrick and the spinner Derek Underwood returned to the team, Old somewhat unfairly as he had played well at Perth. This gave England only two fast bowlers, Bob Willis and Arnold, the medium pace and off-cutters of Tony Greig and the spin of Fred Titmus and Underwood. The Melbourne Cricket Ground was slower than it had ever been, with low bounce that would limit the effectiveness of the Australian fast bowling attack. Ian Chappell won the toss for the third time in a row and became the first captain in history to put the opposition in to bat in successive Tests. The day was overcast and as good for bowling as it would ever be at the MCG and Chappell was confident in the strength of his bowling attack and the fragility of the English batting.

England – First innings
The deterioration of crowd behaviour in Australia has been marked and easily observable over the last few years...Exhibitionists, generally in drunken stupor, invaded the pitches...attempted to run the gauntlet of policemen patrolling the perimeter. When they intruded upon the playing area to congratulate their heroes, their sincerity extended to trying to steal their caps or snitching a bail or stump whilst the umpire was distracted by his concern for the pitch...umpire Brooks and an intruder clashed physically in the centre of the Test pitch. The invader was sent sprawling in the centre of the wicket by an exasperated umpire, who was no doubt unwise to intrude into the domain of law and order.
Frank Tyson

Dennis Lillee (2/70) showed what could be done by swinging the ball like a boomerang in the first over and with his eighth ball turned Dennis Amiss around and clipped the shoulder of his bat to give Doug Walters a difficult catch at third slip. Jeff Thomson did not like bowling into the wind and was replaced after one over by Max Walker, who bowled three maiden overs, but had David Lloyd dropped by Walters as he and Colin Cowdrey slowly advanced the score. Thomson was brought in at Lillee's end with the wind behind him and gave Lloyd a rearing ball that moved on the leg stump, struck his hand and lobbed to Ashley Mallett in the gully to leave England 34/2. 40/2 at lunch. John Edrich came in with his still sore hand and for two hours the veteran partnership added 76 runs between lunch and tea. The 50 was brought up in 160 minutes by a Thomson bouncer that leaped over Rod Marsh's head for four byes and he struck Cowdrey on the chest and elbow with successive balls. Edrich snicked Lillee to Ian Chappell, who dropped the catch and split his hand between his thumb and forefinger, so had to leave the field for treatment. Just before tea two supporters climbed the picket fence and reached the wicket before Umpire Brooks removed them and the interlude spoiled Cowdrey's concentration. He misjudged a Thomson inswinger which he thought was passing him, but rapped his pads and he was given out leg before wicket for 35. In the next over, Edrich tried to glance a ball from Mallett (2/37) and was caught by Marsh for 49, though the batsmen later said he had missed and the ball had come off his pads he was given out by Umpire Bailhache and England were 110/4. Tea was taken when the wicket fell and Mike Denness and Tony Greig resumed after the break. As at Brisbane and Perth, Greig slashed away at everything and was dropped by both Ian and Greg Chappell. Thomson pulled up with a leg-strain and left the field, but Denness cut Mallett into the hands of Marsh and Greig was controversially run out and England were 157/6. Ian Chappell had thrown the ball in from the boundary as Greig was completing his third run and Marsh caught the ball and smashed the stumps as the 6'7" South African reached for the crease with his long handled bat. Photographs later showed that he had just made his ground, but Umpire Bailhache gave him out and Greig refused to go until rudely told to leave by Greg Chappell. The innings now depended on Alan Knott, who made 52, and Fred Titmus who batted until stumps, which were pulled when Lillee bowled round the wicket to the Cockney spinner and Mallett took a catch off his bat-handle. Resuming at 176/7, Thomson returned despite the advice of the team physiotherapist as Knott and Derek Underwood made 39 runs in 38 minutes, the England wicketkeeper cutting with abandon. Thomson was bowling carefully to avoid further injury and was replaced by Walker (1/35) who an overconfident Underwood tried to drive only to give Marsh his third catch of the innings. Bob Willis slashed a ball from Thomson into the covers and Walters took a running catch over his left shoulder. Mike Hendrick hit two boundaries in his 8 not out and the innings ended when Thomson (4/72) yorked Knott with the score on 242 to give him 20 wickets in five innings.

Australia – First Innings
At 3:30pm two umpires emerged from the players' race leading from the dressing rooms. The crowd roared its approval. It seemed there was going to be more play. The cordon of policemen, reinforced after the spectator intrusions of the first day, respectfully made way to allow the umpires to pass. But wait! Surely Tom Brooks does not have a beard. Robin Bailhache, slight in build though he is, is slightly more substantial than the youthful beanpole figure making his way to the centre. It took Bill Watkins, the groundsman at the M.C.G. to detect the impersonation. He hurried from his post by the covers in the centre of the ground to intercept the impostors and turn them back from whence they came. In tribute to a skilful piece of improvised humour, police sergeant Brian Watkins allowed them to make good their escape, instead of conducting them to the local lock-up.
Frank Tyson
The second day had 54,000 spectators, but was affected by rain and bad light. Mike Hendrick took the second over and pulled a hamstring muscle with his fifth ball, tried a sixth and then left, injured beyond help for the rest of the series. England were left with only one fast bowler and Bob Willis gave an extended spell of seven overs and Derek Underwood was given the ball after only six overs, but strangely Fred Titmus was not brought on until after lunch, and then replaced Underwood instead of forming a spin twin partnership. Though Wally Edwards was clearly struggling Ian Redpath was happily playing the depleted attack, but when the umpires gave them the light at 3:13 pm the Australian batsmen walked off. At 3:30 pm a couple of hoaxers dressed up as umpires and "sold the crowd a pup" before they were chased off. Play resumed for two overs at 4:00 pm until a Willis bouncer and light rain convinced the umpires to stop play and the day ended with Australia 63/0. Willis stormed in the next morning and Edwards attempted a forehand smash against a rising ball straight to Denness at mid-off. Ian Chappell's hand was still smarting so Greg Chappell came in and tried to cut Willis through the gully, but the ball lifted and moved in and the ball was taken by the telescopic arm of Tony Greig at second slip. At the other end Titmus (2/43) floated a ball up to Ross Edwards that he edged to Colin Cowdrey at first slip and Australia were 68/3. Doug Walters hit a chancy 36 with the stationary Redpath, whose 55 took 242 minutes to make when Greig (2/63) dismissed them both to bring Ian Chappell and Rod Marsh together at a precarious 126/5. These two added 47 runs when Willis took the new ball and caught the captain lbw for 36, 173/6. Marsh (44) and the free swinging Max Walker (30) pulled Australia up to 237 when they were both caught by Alan Knott, a leaping dive to dismiss Marsh off Titmus and a simple snick to take Walker off Willis. Lillee survived a lbw appeal from Titmus, Ashley Mallett was run out by substitute Chris Old for a duck and Willis bowled Thomson and Australia were all out for 241, one run behind England. Willis took 5/61, his first 5 wicket haul in Tests.

England – Second Innings
This was the one occasion when Australia saw the vintage Amiss. There was no better batting on either side in the series than the 70 he made before lunch, chiefly with Lloyd in their opening stand of 115. For once Lillee and Thomson were hit and hit hard, and naturally their control faltered.
E.W. Swanton
After one Thomson over on the third day the gloom made the umpires pull stumps with England 1/0. Dennis Amiss had made his name as a heavy scoring batsman with tallies of 663 runs (82.87) in the West Indies in 1973–74 and 370 runs (92.50) against India and 220 runs (55.00) against Pakistan in 1974 with five big centuries to his credit. He needed only 93 runs to make 1381 runs in 1974 and equal the record made by Bobby Simpson in 1964. Here, on a flat wicket at Melbourne he showed his talent in Australia by making 70 runs in an opening stand of 115 in the first session against Lillee, Thomson and Walker. David Lloyd looked less certain and gave several chances, including a catch by Ian Chappell which the Australian captain indicated had hit the ground before he took it, much to everyone's surprise. Ashley Mallett (4/60) slowed the run rate and just before lunch tricked LLoyd (44) and had him caught and bowled when the left-hander tried to drive a turning ball. With the pitch taking spin Dennis Lillee slowed his pace and concentrated on swing and after swearing at the gentlemanly Colin Cowdrey was hit through mid-wicket where Greg Chappell leapt across his brother at first slip to take a catch. Jeff Thomson (4/71) took a spell of 3/13 in six overs, having John Edrich caught behind, Denness caught by Ian Chappell and Knott was caught behind. He hit Fred Titmus painfully on the back of his knee, which held up the match until he could struggle back to his feet. Ian Chappell caught Amiss off Mallett ten runs short of his century and 3 runs short of Simpson's record. Mallet also bowled Titmus for a 31-minute duck and had Underwood caught by the captain as England collapsed from 152/2 to 182/8. As at Brisbane Tony Greig restored the situation thrashing 5 fours and a six in his 60 and adding 66 runs with Bob Willis (15) for the ninth wicket before Greg Chappell snatched a catch off a ball heading to the third man boundary. The limping Hendrick came out to help add a few runs, but Willis was bowled trying to drive Thomson, who had now taken 24 wickets in three Tests, an average of four wickets in each England innings. The total of 244 left Australia 365 minutes to make 246 runs to win their third Test in succession.

Australia – Second Innings
In seven overs by Titmus and Underwood, bowling to normal containing fields, Australia added only seven runs...a protest against Titmus bowling to six leg-side fielders and Underwood operating without a slip. But what did they want – England to serve up the Ashes on a plate with, as Neville Cardus once observed, parsley around them?
E.W. Swanton

There was only time for one over before stumps on the fourth day and Bob Willis conceded 4 extras, reducing the target to 242. The next morning Tony Greig (4/56) got Wally Edwards lbw for a duck as he shuffled across the wicket and in the following over Ian Chappell was lbw to Bob Willis (1/56) and Australia were 5/2. Ian Redpath (39) and Greg Chappell (61) resurrected the Australian innings with a stand of 101, but scored runs a crawl – 68 runs in the morning session – and Redpath survived two lbw appeals and was dropped by the normally reliable Denness. Derek Underwood (0/43) and Fred Titmus (2/62) were brought on, but found little turn and Chappell was the third man in the innings to be leg before wicket when a Titmus shooter hit him on the ankle. Redpath had been almost run out, but John Edrich's poor return allowed him to get home. Ross Edwards was caught by Titmus's spin as the ball kicked up, clipped the edge of the bat and was caught by David Lloyd, then Redpath's luck ran out and he was run out by Underwood and Knott when he crossed the crease without grounding his bat and Australia was 121/5. The spinners were now bowling with two slips, a short-leg and short mid-wicket, tied up Doug Walters (32) and Rod Marsh (40) and reduced the 40,000 crowd to silence. By tea Australia were 145/5, needing 101 runs to win in two hours, or about 28 overs. Greig replaced Underwood and appealed for lbw against Walters when a shooter got through, then had him caught by Denness at 171/6, but by 5 pm Australia needed 55 runs in the mandatory 15 overs in the last hour of the game. After some discussion between Denness, Edrich, Cowdrey and Greig the new ball was not taken and Titmus and Underwood – nicknamed "Steptoe and Son" – carried on with defensive fields to a displeased Marsh who refused to make runs in protest. After six overs Willis and Greig took the new ball and the latter had Marsh caught by a diving Knott on the leg-side. Marsh was reluctant to go and when Grieg theatrically pointed the way to the pavilion he was booed by the crowd. Max Walker (23 not out) and Dennis Lillee (14) thumped 22 runs off three overs from Willis and Underwood was brought back on to bowl the penultimate over with the England team spread around the outfield, which was a maiden. Greig bowled the last over with 14 runs or 3 wickets needed for victory. Greig's fifth delivery was no-balled as he had three fieldsmen behind square-leg – the rule introduced to prevent Bodyline. With three balls left and 9 runs needed Lillee drove Greig into the hands of Denness in the covers. Walker had crossed ends and his single off the penultimate ball ensured a draw and the final ball was a bouncer to Ashley Mallett. Australia ended on 238/8, 8 runs short of victory.

Result
On the whole the result was fair enough – the closest-fought draw in my experience in Tests between England and Australia.
E.W. Swanton

Australia and England drew the Third Test, leaving Australia with its 2–0 lead in the series. Though England had yet to pass 300 runs in an innings in the series they had shown that they could reduce Australia to their level and it was a considerable improvement over the defeats at Brisbane and Perth.

One Day International – Melbourne

Preliminaries
The first ever One Day International had been played at the MCG to replace the washed out Third Test of the 1970–71 Ashes series. Four years later a match was organised for New Year's Day instead of the Melbourne Test usually played on that day, the Test being moved to Boxing Day.

Australian Innings
Mike Denness won the toss and put Australia in to bat with immediate results as Wally Edwards and Ian Redpath were sent back to the pavilion with the score on 11/2. Ian Chappell hit 42 off 49 balls before Peter Lever caught him in the outfield off Chris Old (4/57) with the score on 65/3. Greg Chappell made 44 off 50 balls until Old bowled him, Ross Edwards and Doug Walters to leave Australia 139/6. Wickets now fell regularly as the lower order tried to add a few runs, but they were bowled out for 190 after 34.5 overs, leaving England to make 191 off their full 40 overs.

England Innings
Dennis Amiss had made the first two one-day international centuries and hit 47 off 54 balls out of the 70 run opening stand with David Lloyd (49). Amiss was bowled by Max Walker and Lloyd was run out, but more controversially the bowler Greg Chappell ran out Brian Luckhurst when he was backing up and England were 124/3. The big hitting Chris Old was promoted up the order and struck 12 runs off 10 balls before be was bowled by Alan Hurst (2/27), who was playing instead of Dennis Lillee. Off the only ball he faced Tony Greig ran three and was then run out, followed by Denness and Keith Fletcher who both fell nine runs short of victory. Alan Knott and Derek Underwood made the winning runs with the help of a few extras and 191/7 was reached with 23 balls to spare.

Result
England won by 3 wickets and Ian Chappell and Dennis Amiss were made the two men of the match for their entertaining innings, even though they were not the top scorers. Oddly, the result was almost a mirror image of the first One Day International, when England had made 190 and Australia 191/5.

Fourth Test – Sydney

Preliminaries
If Denness did not warrant selection from amongst seventeen players on the eve of the Fourth Test, the chances are that he was not good enough in the first place to have been in the touring party. It required courage to drop himself at Sydney. It would have been far more judicious act of courage to have refused the captaincy of the touring side to Australia when it was first offered to him.
Frank Tyson
The great shock of the Fourth Test was that Mike Denness became the first Test captain to drop himself for poor form. Percy Chapman had dropped himself for the Fifth Test in 1928–29 because of flu and Wally Hammond in 1946–47 due to fibrositis, but in both these cases the series had already been decided. England could still win the series by winning the last three Tests, or hold onto the Ashes by winning two and drawing the other. Denness had made only 65 runs (10.83) so far in the series and was desperately out of form, but his replacement Keith Fletcher was hardly a better bet with 45 runs (11.25) and had been dropped for the Third Test. The vice-captain John Edrich was put in charge, an old pro who had captained Surrey since 1973, but was unlikely to fire up the team or take any chances. Geoff Arnold replaced the injured Mike Hendrick, but Chris Old was made twelfth man and England went into the match with just two fast bowlers on a lively green wicket that made Frank Tyson "worry about the safety of the English batsmen". Australia made a change to their line up with the opener Wally Edwards being dropped after making 68 runs (11.33) in the first three Tests. He was replaced by the tall, athletic Rick McCosker who had made four consecutive first class centuries that season and 52 and 56 for NSW against the tourists. Unfortunately, this left Australia with only one opening batsman and McCosker was sent in with Ian Redpath on his debut, though admittedly on his home ground. Ian Chappell won the toss for the fourth time in a row (Edrich called heads, while Denness had always called tails) and chose to bat regardless of the help the wicket was due to give the bowlers.

Australia – First Innings
Whether or not Walter's misfortune put The Hill in bad way I can't say, but what with the beer and the overcrowding and the heat the denizens thereof had one of their noisiest, most refractory days.
E.W. Swanton

The first ball was a leg bye to bring Rick McCosker on strike and he glanced the ball off his legs to bring up his first Test runs to the applause of the 52,164 strong crowd. He made 80 on debut and added 96 with Redpath as the England fast bowlers missed their chance with the new ball and the pitch proved to be truer than expected. McCosker edged a ball that fell short of Alan Knott, slashed another that was missed by Edrich in the gully and Redpath nearly ran himself out off a no-ball (photographs later showed that he should have been out). The England captain set defensive fields from the outset, with a third man and fine leg and only three close fielders and Australia were in little trouble. Redpath was hit on the hand by Bob Willis and finally out when he trod on his stumps off Titmus for 33, but McCosker made 80 when he was disturbed by the rumpus from the Sydney Hill. Fans were throwing beer cans at Tony Greig, one hitting him on the back, and Umpire Brooks had to intervene to calm them down and have the field cleared of rubbish before play could resume. McCosker's concentration was disturbed and he was caught by Knott off Greig (4/104) Ian Chappell was almost run out by David Lloyd for a duck, but made 53 before he was caught by Knott off Geoff Arnold (5/86). Ross Edwards came out at 199/3 to the disappointment of his local fans, who wanted their hero Doug Walters to come out and score a century as he had at Perth and had erected the famous "Doug Walters Stand" banner on the Hill. Edwards made only 15 in a stand of 52 with Greg Chappell when he played over a yorker from Greig two balls short of stumps and play was ended early at 251/4. This soon became 255/5 when Arnold took the new ball and nipped it back to catch Walters lbw, but Chappell and Marsh added 50 runs in 56 minutes. They were removed by the ever-combative Grieg, who removed Marsh's middle stump with a yorker and caught Chappell off Arnold when he looked set for a hundred to leave them 310/7. The Australian lower order made runs quickly enough despite being repeatedly bounced by Arnold and Grieg, who hit Lillee on the elbow and bruised Ashley Mallett's bowling hand. Fletcher told Lillee that he had been asking for bouncers the way he bowled and the fast bowler's reply made him complain to Umpire Brooks about his use of language. Two bouncers in one over resulted in Greig being warned for intimatory bowling, who asked if Lillee was restricted to one bouncer per over to him as well. Brooks saying that as Lillee was a tailender and Greig was a batsman the same standard did not apply. In the end Arnold dismissed Lillee and Walker, but Thomson hit 24 not out off 23 balls before Mallet was lbw to Grieg with the score on 405.

England – First Innings
Chappell, the grandson of Victor Richardson, had no doubt been weaned on tales of the Bodyline tour by his grandfather, one of the few Australian batsmen to fight it out with Larwood and his support bowlers. Forty years later, and it was time to pay back the Poms. When Keith Fletcher deflected a ball on to his cap and crumpled in a heap as it dropped just short of cover point, Ian Chappell probably thought his grandafther would approve if he had been alive to witness the carnage. One can only hope that the reaction of Vic Richardson – a combative, but essentially a cheerful, sporting cricketer – would have surprised Chappell.
Bob Willis

The England innings began with 10 extras from Jeff Thomson with Rod Marsh leaping behind the stumps in vain as one ball lifted over the heads of the batsman and wicketkeeper for four. Thereafter wickets fell regularly with the Hillites cheering on the fast bowlers, but it was Max Walker (2/77) who made the breakthrough when he swung the ball to the edge of Dennis Amiss's bat to see it superbly caught by Mallett in the gully. Thomson took a surprisingly good catch to dismiss Lloyd off a Lillee bouncer and then beat Cowdrey three balls in a row before the master was caught by McCosker at short leg. This left England 69/3, but Edrich and Fletcher saw the day out safely enough. One ball from the captain was driven full into McCosker's face, knocking him unconscious for five minutes and he was helped off the field. Mallet was brought on at the end of the day, but asked to be taken off after one over because of his bruised hand from that morning. Returning on the third day Thomson was bowling at his fastest and took 1/12 off five overs, having Edrich missed by Redpath in the slips, Greig caught by Greg Chappell and almost having Alan Knott out on the second, third and fourth balls he faced, dropped by Marsh, a caught behind not given and almost bowled by an inswinger. Fletcher was hit on the head by a bouncer and was caught by Redpath off Walker to leave England at 123/5, their top order failing again. After his escape Knott rode his luck and sliced 11 fours in an innings of 82, adding 57 with Edrich (50), 60 with Fred Titmus (22) and 33 with Derek Underwood (27). Knott and Underwood took 14 runs off one Lillee over and Ian Chappell had to set a defensive field for the first time in the series. The wicketkeeper was finally dismissed leaning back ready to cut the short ball and had his stumps flattened by a Thomson half-volley, but Lillee repeatedly bounced the tailenders and gave Bob Willis a beamer which fortunately missed his head. Willis was bowled by Thomson (4/74) and Lillee took the last wicket, having Underwood caught by Walker when he drove high into the covers. England were out for 295, having saved the follow on, which looked unlikely at one point, but still 110 runs behind.

Australia – Second Innings
His batting was disdainfully untroubled and his strength on the on-drive caused the English bowlers to revise their policy of pitching constrainingly close to the batsman's pads. Reaching a contemptuous fifty in eighty minutes, Chappell depressed the accelerator of attack and Australia cruised past the century mark in four minutes under two hours.
Frank Tyson

England were dismissed just before tea, so the interval was taken early and Ian Redpath and Ian Chappell came out to open as Rick McCoster was still dazed from his injury, having fielded for only a few overs in the morning before he had to retire again. Chappell was caught by David Lloyd close to the ground off Willis, but there was no immediate appeal as Lloyd had hurt his bruised fingers and left to have them tended to when the Australian captain was given out. This brought in his brother Greg Chappell at 15/1 and he added 108 runs with Redpath by the end of the day, with 100 runs coming in 110 minutes. Resuming on 123/1 Redpath and Chappell took their partnership to 220 runs, a record for Australia against England in Australia, beating the 216 made by Bill Woodfull and Hunter Hendry back in 1928–29. These came slowly at first as Edrich set a defensive field and Arnold and Willis bowled accurately for the first 90 minutes. However, when they were replaced by Underwood, Titmus and Greig, Chappell increased the run-rate and when Willis returned the Queensland captain took 13 runs off one over. He made his first century of the series, 1,000th run of the season and was dropped on 136 by Underwood at deep fine-leg with The Hill braying behind him. He was out for 144 trying to hit Arnold for six and skying the ball to Lloyd at mid-wicket. Chappell had now made 122, 51, 58, 71, 62, 2, 61, 44, 84 and 144 against the tourists in the season, including the Queensland vs MCC match and the One Day International. Walters came in and tried to impress his fans with another Perth-like run feast, but tried to hit Underwood across the line and was bowled for 5. With the sluggish Redpath now setting the pace and England trying to delay the declaration the game drifted, but the opener was out for 105 in 344 minutes when he uncharacteristically hit out at Underwood (2/65) and was caught by the substitute Chris Old. A few runs later Marsh was nearly run out and hurried off to the pavilion as Australia declared at 289/4, leaving England 400 runs to win in 500 minutes.

England – Second Innings
In his recent book 'Back to the Mark' the fast bowler had written 'I try to hit a batsman in the rib-cage when I bowl a purposeful bouncer and I want it to hurt so much that the batsman doesn't want to face me any more'. How well he had succeeded in Edrich's case! The irony of his pyrrhic victory was that Edrich had not been felled by a bouncer...The English press greeted the incident with headlines such as: 'Licence to Kill!', 'Lillee should be banned' – '007, James Bond cricket'. The atmosphere on and off the field was emotionally electric. Bodyline was freely discussed. In the background the crowd, lusting for more blood and guts, stirred the embers of controversy chanting for 'Lillee, Lillee'.
Frank Tyson

The declaration became just before tea, which was taken early again, but storm clouds gathered over the ground and many of the 35,900 crowd left for home. The Umpire made a brief inspection, but declined to resume play due to the gloom and the rain promptly came down a few minutes later. However, the clouds passed over and the ground was cleared up quickly enough for play to resume at five minutes past five. Dennis Amiss and David Lloyd survived, making 33/0 by stumps even though they each gave an easy chance, Amiss hitting a full-toss in the still dazed McCosker's midriff, where he fumbled the catch and Walters dropping Lloyd in the slips. England began the last day needing 367 runs in 360 minutes and to everyone's surprise Amiss and Lloyd set about the bowling as if they meant to win. The wicket was now brown, slow and even without any spin and they reached 68/0 off 86 minutes. At this point Lloyd edged the ball off Thomson (2/74) to Greg Chappell, who took his twelfth catch of the series. Amiss gloved an unplayable, rearing ball from Lillee (2/65) to the predatory Marsh. John Edrich came in and ducked a Lillee bouncer that stayed low and gave him a sickening blow to his ribs. He was helped off the field by the England physiotherapist Bernie Thomas and taken to hospital for an X-ray. Colin Cowdrey steered an awkwardly lifting ball from Walker (2/46) to Ian Chappell and England were 74/3, effectively 74/4. Keith Fletcher was joined by Tony Greig who took the score past 100, but the Essex captain, having fended off a sharp bouncer the ball before, played back to a fuller delivery and was caught by Ashley Mallett in the gully. Mallett's hand had recovered enough for him to bowl and he took 2/3 after lunch, Knott caught by Redpath glancing the ball off his legs and Titmus was caught sweeping. To everyone's surprise Edrich returned to the wicket at 156/6; he had been told that his ribs were only badly bruised, but he moved with obvious pain (later tests revealed that they were broken). Ian Chappell promptly brought Lillee back into the attack even though he was not fully rested and the fast bowler gave the England captain two overs of short-pitched bowling. At the other end Greig had made a confident 54, but was stumped trying to drive Mallet (4/21). Underwood was caught and bowled by Walker and England went in to tea on 184/8. On their return Edrich played a captain's innings against Lillee and Thomson, controlling the strike and bringing up the 200. Lillee ironically bowled Willis with a yorker just after being warned for the third or fourth time about his short-pitched bowling to the tailender. By this time England were 211/9, but only needed to survive 10 overs for a draw. Arnold held out for 35 minutes and made 14 when he misread Mallet's spin and edged him to Greg Chappell. Edrich had batted for 155 minutes for his 33 not out, but it was not enough. England were dismissed for 228 and lost the Test by 171 runs and with it the Ashes. The crowd flooded the field as the players walked off and Australia started their celebrations.

Result
I suspected that even the Australian administrators were praying for rain and the delaying of the final outcome of a series that was proving a financial bonanza. A draw in Sydney would do wonders for the Adelaide gate and takings; whereas an Australian win and the resolution of the rubber might cause a loss of interest in the remaining Tests.
Frank Tyson

Australia won by 171 runs to win the series 3–0 with two Tests to play. They recovered the Ashes having lost them four years before on the same ground in the 1970–71 Ashes series and Greg Chappell equalled Bobby Simpson's record of 13 catches by a fielder in a Test series.

Fifth Test – Adelaide

Preliminaries
A fresh pocket of black clay soil was discovered in the preceding winter and the whole Adelaide wicket area had been re-laid. A dispute between the cricket authorities and the local football players also meant that little of the Australian game was played on its undisturbed surface during the winter of 1974. The question about the Adelaide surface for the Fifth Test was whether it would be a pitch in the old tradition of batting excellence or a wicket whose unsettled nature would lead to bowling supremacy throughout the game.
Frank Tyson

England had a good time between the Fourth and Fifth Tests. Mike Denness returned to form with 157 not out in their innings victory over Tasmania and 99 in a 187 run win over New South Wales. Dennis Amiss made 52 and 124 in the Sydney game and Chris Old took 7/59. Denness therefore returned to the team as England captain, replacing the injured vice-captain John Edrich who was still recovering from his damaged ribs, which had in fact been broken, not just bruised as previously thought. Australia dropped the batsman Ross Edwards in favour of the local leg-spinner Terry Jenner. There was a storm the night before the first day, which ripped the covers off the field and flooded the ground. The nightwatchman had not called the curator, so the damage could not be repaired in time for the first day's play, which had to be abandoned. The ex-Australian umpire Col Egar thought that play might not even start on the second day. What made it more distressing was that a record crowd appeared despite the series having already been won, but had to be turned away. Jim Laker and Ken Barrington were part of the crowd, escorting travel groups of British cricket fans. As it was there was a steady wind which helped dry out the ground overnight, except at the River Torrens end, but the famously long boundary was pulled in with ropes marking a now egg shaped Adelaide Oval. Denness called heads and for the first time England won the toss. With the pitch still worse for wear he chose to field, the third time the winning captain had taken this unusual course in the series.

Australia – First Innings
Doug Walters is not a creature of habit nor indeed the perfect cricket technician. He is a batsman who depends on his natural aggressive flair and his superb eye...While Jenner top-scored in Australia's first innings it was Walters who not only bore the brunt of the worst of the wicket but also scored freely in spite of the pitch.
Frank Tyson

Ian Redpath (21) and Rick McCosker (35) upset the England plans by adding 52 in 83 minutes for the first wicket. Geoff Arnold made the ball cut and lift immediately, but Bob Willis struggled and after six overs Derek Underwood replaced Arnold, who changed ends so as to have the advantage of the wind behind him. "Deadly Derek" (7/113) was called an umbrella bowler – there in case of a rain-affected wicket – and he was able to make the ball leap and turn from his first over. The openers managed to survive, and by surviving most of the first session they ensured that the Australian middle order would be able to play on a less lethal wicket. Denness failed to bring on Fred Titmus at the other end until the last over before lunch in conditions tailor-made for spin bowling, a decision for which he was greatly criticised though E.W. Swanton thought the damp patches were not on Titmus's length. As it was Underwood had to do all the work, bowling 29 overs compared to 31 by the other five bowlers. He achieved the breakthrough when McCosker clipped a ball to Cowdrey in the slips, then both Chappell brothers, Ian was surprised by a leaping ball and skied it to Knott, while Greg was lbw to a ball that turned from leg to middle stump while he tried to run a leg-bye. With the last ball before lunch Redpath edged the ball to Greig at silly-point and Australia were 77/4. After lunch Marsh tried to hit Underwood out of the attack, but was taken by Greig at mid-wicket at 84/5 with the Kent bowler having taken all the wickets 5/35. The South Australian sun was now drying out the wicket, which reverted to its normal, placid self in the afternoon. The brilliant Doug Walters hit 55 off 66 balls with 7 fours and a six, adding 80 with Terry Jenner who made his only Test fifty on his home ground. Titmus replaced Underwood just as the pitch was losing its turn and Walters was getting into his stride. The Australian batsmen took 24 runs off two overs and Walters's six was caught one handed in the member's stand. The tired Underwood was brought back as his left arm spin could not be hit so easily and Walters spooned a catch to a surprised Willis at mid-off. The tall Max Walker had yet to fail in the series and hit 41, adding 77 with Jenner until the latter became Underwood's seventh successive wicket when he misjudged the flight and hit over a ball. Walker hit what looked like an easy two only to end up at the same end as Lillee while Denness threw down the stumps after a fine pick up. Lillee walked to keep Walker in until Amiss insisted that Walker was the man to go and the umpire agreed. Lillee (26) added 36 with Mallett (23 not out) and hooked Willis for four until the new ball was taken. Willis then spread Lillee's stumps and Arnold those of Thomson and Australia were out for 304, the mystery being why they had not been out in the morning on such a poor wicket.

England – First Innings
The South Australia Test always coincides with the Australia Day week-end. Without fail the South Australian Cricket Association celebrates 26 January with a stirring flag-raising ceremony before the start of play. The flag-pole before the member's enclosure is erected and both teams, together with the officials and umpires, troop out to form a guard of honour on each flank of the President of the Cricket Association as he raises the flag. To a man, and woman, the crowd rise to their feet to sing the national song...the men placing their hats and hands over their hearts. Equally there was no doubting the sincere determination of the Australian team as they took the field with their caps set in a resolute angle over their eyes.
Frank Tyson

Amiss and Lloyd lasted the few balls left on the first day and a couple of byes gave the 2/0. On the third day Lillee for once looked better than Thomson, who was working hard digging the ball into the soft pitch. Throughout the series Lillee had peppered batsmen with bouncers, but on this occasion he had Amiss caught by Ian Chappell off the third ball of the day, bowled at medium-fast pace and well up. Encouraged by this the Western Australian bowled with much greater skill and even when he crowded Cowdrey with off and leg side slips in Bodyline fashion he kept the ball up and was rewarded with 4/49, his best figures of the series. Lloyd was playing so far back that he was in danger of stepping on his stumps, but ended when he glanced Lillee straight behind to Marsh with England 19/2. The River Torrens Stand had a banner "Denness' Last Stand" and a trumpeter in the crowd played the Last Post when the England captain came to the wicket. Buoyed by his recent innings against Tasmania and NSW he struck 51 off 66 balls with 7 fours, using the square cut with effect. At noon the concentration of the batsmen was disturbed by the 21 gun salute from the barracks behind the Victor Richardson Stand, which held up play for five minutes. When play resumed Cowdrey was dismissed off a Thomson bouncer that swung in and flew off his bat high above Walker's head, only for the 6'4" Victorian to leap up Aussie Rules style to take an 'impossible' catch. Thomson (3/58) also accounted for Denness a few minutes before lunch when an attempted cut went to Marsh, having made most of England's 90/4. Thus the Queenslander set a new Australian record for the most wickets in a series by a fast bowler, beating Lillee's 31 in the 1972 Ashes series. Terry Jenner's leg-spin was brought in after lunch, but Keith Fletcher hit him for 12 runs off one over and he was replaced by Ashley Mallett's off-spin. At the other end Tony Greig became Lillee's third victim when he slashed a ball behind for Marsh's third catch of the day at 130/5. The last five wickets fell in a daze as first Fletcher tried to cut Thomson two feet off the off-stump and was caught by Ian Chappell and Knott, Titmus and Underwood gave Mallett figures of 3/14 by trying to sweep him out of the ground, giving two catches to Lillee in the deep and Greg Chappell a record 14 catches by a fielder in a Test series. Lillee bowled Arnold for a duck and England collapsed from 155/5 to 172 all out, a deficit of 132 runs. It was a poor performance, the tourists were dismissed on a flat wicket inside two sessions and threw away the rain-given chance of winning the Test on the second day.

Australia – Second Innings
As in the First and Fourth Tests Australia were left to improve a large first innings lead and set England a target with a declaration. Rick McCosker was caught by the wicketkeeper off Arnold on 16/1, but there were few other problems for the home side who ended the day on 111/2. England could have taken more wickets as Fletcher and Cowdrey both dropped Ian Chappell, who hit Underwood for six, then made an indecisive drive-sweep that skied the ball to Knott for 41. In the intervening rest day the players were invited to the Barossa Valley vineyard of 'Windy' Hill-Smith, where Jeff Thomson sprained his shoulder playing tennis. The following day he found that he could not raise his bowling arm and that he was out of cricket for the rest of the series, having taken a remarkable 33 wickets (17.93) in four and a half Tests. To balance the books Bob Willis was also out for the rest of the series with his recurring knee cap injury. Redpath and Greg Chappell lasted the day, but were both out in the morning to Underwood (4/102) to leave Australia 133/4 as only 24 runs were scored in the first 12 overs of the day. Doug Walters (71 not out) and Rod Marsh (55) were more aggressive and took 10 runs off one Underwood over. Marsh swept the spinner, once for six, twice to see Knott spill a running catch and third to be caught by Greig. Chappell waited for a few more overs before declaring at 272/5, 404 runs ahead with 500 minutes of play left, very similar to the situation at Sydney.

England – Second Innings
The excitement and interest of the dying game now centred around the batting performance of Alan Knott. His last day survival was more than just occupation of the crease. Beginning the day without a run to his name, he consistently thumbed his nose at the Australian attack for over three hours, playing shots even though he knew that his ship was sinking under his very feet. It was a magnificent solo effort of defiance.
Frank Tyson

There were hopes that England could make the 405 runs for victory on the now flat pitch, but these were soon dispelled when Amiss, Lloyd and Cowdrey were out with 10 runs on the board and Lillee 2/0. Lillee (4/69) and Walker (3/83) were able to swing the ball and Amiss picked up his second pair against Australia, having done this before at Old Trafford in 1968. Cowdrey was taken by a low left-handed catch by Mallett in the gully "that those who were not present would not believe". Ian Chappell decided to feed Denness's favourite cut and stationed Jenner at fly-slip while Lillee bowled outside off-stump, the captain duly cut and was out for 14. The lanky Greig played over a low ball from Walker and by the end of the day England were 94/5, thanks mainly to Fletcher's 39. The following day Fletcher and Knott took 15 runs off Lillee's first over and their fifty partnership came up in 51 minutes against the spin of Jenner and Mallett. Lillee had Fletcher lbw on his return when a yorker hit the Essex-man's toe and he was reluctantly out for 63 at 144/6. Knott made his fourth fifty of the series and he and Titmus made 50 runs in even time. Jenner went round the wicket and bowled googlies at Titmus as if he were an off-spinner and rapped him on the pads three times in a row without playing a stroke, the third producing a lbw decision from the umpire. Mallett bowled a spell of 2/1 off 8 overs; Underwood caught at grass level by Ian Chappell and Arnold bowled, both making pairs like Amiss. This left England 217/9 and Knott quickly cut his way to a century, the first by an England keeper against Australia since Les Ames at Lords in 1934, Ames being at Adelaide to congratulate his fellow Man of Kent. He made an unbeaten 106 when Willis was out and England were dismissed for 241.

Result
There was no doubt in my mind that Adelaide represent the very nadir of the Australian tour...The reasons behind the ease of their successful loss were fourfold: unenterprising captaincy, bad England batting, a good Lillee bowling performance and a lack of penetration in the depleted touring attack.
Frank Tyson

Australia beat England by 163 runs to take a 4–0 lead in the series. Greg Chappell had taken a then record 14 catches in a Test series and Jeff Thomson 33 wickets (17.93), a record for an Australian fast bowler.

Sixth Test – Melbourne

Preliminaries
The North Melbourne Cricket Club, inspired by their president, the former Test 'keeper, Len Maddocks, launched the first morning of the game with a champagne breakfast in the sumptuous ballroom of the Melbourne Hilton Hotel. The five hundred breakfasters were a motley crew. They included state and federal parliamentarians such as Dick Hamer and Billy Snedden, trade union leaders of the calibre of Bob Hawke, former players like Neil Harvey, Bob Cowper, Richie Benaud and Sam Loxton and members of the cricket and business communities. The proceedings were compered in humorous vein by football commentator Lou Richards and the programme was televised live in colour with the proceeds going to charity. Tony Greig and Dennis Lillee each received awards as the main personalities of the series...
Frank Tyson

Injuries affected the selection of the two sides for the final Test. Mike Hendrick was still suffering from his hamstring, Bob Willis from his troubled knees, so Peter Lever was brought in for Willis and Chris Old's good form was finally rewarded with a Test place instead of the veteran Fred Titmus. David Lloyd had an old football injury to his neck flare up and Colin Cowdrey took his place as makeshift opener. John Edrich had now recovered from his broken ribs and was recalled to the team in place of the out of form Brian Luckhurst. Jeff Thomson was out with his tennis shoulder and Australia brought in Geoff Dymock, a fast-medium left-arm bowler who had taken a wicket with his second ball the previous year at Adelaide. After top-scoring at Sydney the leg-spinner Terry Jenner was dropped for the return of batsman Ross Edwards. Despite the hot weather a thunderstorm wet the covers before the match and the groundsmen spilled water on the wicket when removing them in the morning, which would drastically affect play. Ian Chappell won the toss for the fifth time in the series and chose to bat, probably as he underestimated the amount of water on the wicket which was otherwise excellent for batting.

Australia – First Innings
Walker stole a single to mid-off and with his eye fixed exclusively on the swooping fieldsman, Denness, hurtled blindly towards the bowler's wicket. Umpire Brooks, too, was concentrating on the ball and fieldsman whilst moving towards the off side and was skittled by the batsman who flung himself in the direction of safety with little or no consideration for the safety of others. Walker beat Denness's return to the wicket, but at the cost of a collision between the immovable mass and the irresistible force. Umpire Brooks, having been a first class bowler in his day was a man of some substance, and pound for pound was a good match for the burly Walker. Umpire and bowler toppled slowly to the ground and...resumed their upright position slowly...
Frank Tyson

Ian Redpath and Rick McCosker came out to open for Australia on another wet wicket, but this time failed to make the stand that saved Australia at Adelaide. They were not even able to claim that their wickets fell because of the damp patch on a fast bowler's length. Lever had increased his pace with age and was thought to be faster than Willis, but had dropped the ball short at Brisbane for figures of 0/111. Back in the England team he pitched the ball up and moved it in the heavy atmosphere to have both men caught by Greig at second slip. The English fielding perked up, Mike Denness set aggressive fields and it took 25 minutes for Australia to score their first run. In the Melbourne heat Geoff Arnold was replaced by Old after four overs, but Lever stayed on for seven overs and was rewarded with figures of 4/13 as Greg Chappell was caught in the covers by Denness, Ross Edwards was taken by Dennis Amiss at leg-slip for 0 and Australia were 23/4. The ball was now leaping dangerously, Ian Chappell had to fend a ball off his head and Greg had been hit on the chin. The captain decided that attack was the best form of defence and made 43 of his team's 66/5 by lunch, with Doug Walters popping the ball off Old to Edrich in gully with a frightful stroke. The exhausted Lever only managed two overs after lunch and Chappell and Rod Marsh hit 54 runs for the sixth wicket. Chris Old (3/50) had Chappell (65) caught behind after making a too fine a glance and bowled Marsh (29) for 115/7. Max Walker and Lillee hit out a few more runs, even turning down bad light so that they could continue play and get England in. The burly Tasmanian ran straight into Umpire Brooks trying to avoid a run out they were both sent to the ground. Lever returned to remove Lillee and Mallett and Greig ended the innings by having Dymock out for a duck, with Walker 20 not out. Lever's 6/38 was his best bowling in Tests and Australia were out four minutes before tea for 152, easily their lowest score of the series.

England – First Innings
Denness's 188 beat by 15 runs the next best score by an England captain in Australia. A.E. Stoddart's great innings on this ground just eighty years before. It was also the highest Test score made by an English batsmen in Australia since the war – a fact which escaped general notice at the time.
E.W. Swanton

The gloom increased during tea and play was delayed regardless of the vocal protests of the 32,000 strong crowd, with some being arrested as they tried to invade the ground. When play resumed Amiss and Cowdrey – his 114th and final Test – came out to open. They stayed out long enough for Amiss to be out lbw to a Lillee swinger for his third successive duck and stumps were drawn at 15/1. In the morning Walker had Cowdrey caught behind off a ball that bounced surprisingly, but Lillee pulled up with a trapped nerve in his foot and was unable to play for the rest of the Test. With their two strike bowlers removed and the damp spot drying out Australia struggled and Denness and Edrich took full advantage, taking the score from 18/2 to 167/3 with a third wicket stand of 149 and overtaking the home side's total with ease. There were some difficult chances off the England captain, but it was the otherwise impeccable Edrich who was out for 70 edging Walker to Ian Chappell at first slip. The vice-captain was replaced by Keith Fletcher who had suffered so much in the series with Denness, but now proved that they were attractive batsmen when not faced by blistering pace and England were 273/3 by the end of the day. Walker bowled manfully and Mallett tried to stop the flow of runs, but when Walters and Chappell were brought on for long spells the game was up. Denness was almost run out on 94 and bought up his hundred with a leg-glance that just missed Marsh's gloves, but rode his luck well. He was only the fourth England captain to make a Test hundred in Australia after Andrew Stoddart's 173 in 1894–95, Archie MacLaren's 116 in 1901–02 and Peter May's 113 in 1958–59. When Walker finally had him out caught and bowled the next day he had made 188 in 492 minutes with 17 fours, still the highest Test century by an England captain in Australia. Denness and Fletcher had added 192 for the fourth wicket took take the score to 359/4, the first time England had passed 300 in the series. Fletcher made his first Ashes century in 333 minutes with only seven fours, though he and Greig added 100 runs in 71 minutes as the big South African started thumping the tired bowlers around the deserted ground. By tea the third new ball had been seen off and England were 496/4, a lead of 344. Discussion of when Denness would declare were rendered null and void when the bullish Walker ran through the England batting as the tourists lost 6 wickets for 33 runs after tea. The tall Tasmanian had already taken 3/131, but produced a spell of 5/12 as Greig was caught off a mistimed drive for 89 off 94 balls, followed later in the over by Fletcher for 146. Old was bowled by a shooter from Dymock, who bowled just as long and as well, but with no luck. Alan Knott and Geoff Arnold were caught behind glancing the ball and Underwood was bowled to dismiss England for 529, only their second score over 500 in Australia since Bodyline in 1932–33. Walker returned to the pavilion with figures of 8/143 off 42.2 overs, his best analysis in Tests.

Australia – Second Innings
Every Greg Chappell score is compiled with the maximum of timing, a straight elegance of backlift and an unassuming mastery of the bowlers. it makes the observer wonder whether the bowlers pose any problems of flight, spin and swerve to the younger Chappell. Throughout the series it was maintained that Chappell was never fully fit because of a tonsil infection. if that were the case one can only feel sorry for the bowlers when he returns to full health.
Frank Tyson

With Australia needing 377 runs to avoid an innings defeat Denness could afford to set an aggressive field, but to no avail as Redpath and McCosker made 32/0 when bad light stopped play. Peter Lever had caught a fever on the rest day and retired after three overs, to be replaced by Old and Greig. Though much of the pitch was flat the area around the damp patch of the first day was pock-marked and made the odd ball fly up and hit the hands of the batsmen, who were surrounded by slips, gullies and short-legs. McCosker took to hooking the ball over their heads and outscored Redpath so that when he edged Arnold (3/83) to Cowdrey for his 120th and last Test catch he had made 76 of their 111 in 108 minutes. Redpath (83) added another century stand with Ian Chappell (50) until the captain glanced another catch to Knott off Grieg (4/88), but was unsatisfied with the decision and stayed to argue with the bowler and losing his temper in the process before leaving at 215/2. Greig caught Redpath at close short-leg, but the England appeals were turned down and in his next over the South African saw 12 runs scored while Greg Chappell gave three half-chances. After 335 minutes Redpath was out for 83, hitting the ball to Amiss at short-leg, who took a 'golden catch'. Soon after Ross Edwards appeared to be lbw, but much to the surprise of the commentary box was given not out, having caught a tiny edge as he moved across the ball. Denness delayed the taking of the new ball as he hoped to use it in the morning when Lever was better, but was forced to take it in the evening to no avail as Australia reached 273/3 with the local press proclaiming "WE SAVED IT". Lever was back on the field, but it was Arnold who made the breakthrough, feeding Edwards his favourite leg-glance until he edged it behind to Knott. The Surrey bowler then made the ball cut from leg to hit Walter's off stump. When Denness caught Marsh off a Lever out-swinger Australia were 306/6 and struggling, but Chappell made his seventh half-century of the series and with Walker took Australia to 360/6 by lunch. After the break the tail collapsed, Walker got above himself and drove the ball into the hands of the bowler Greig, Lever moved the ball back nine inches to bowl Chappell (102) just after he reached his second century of the series and Mallett, Dymock and the injured Lillee failed to make any runs and Australia were suddenly out for 373 with three hours to spare.

Result
My last sight of Melbourne Cricket Ground was an impromptu little gathering on the outfield in front of the banner reading 'M.C.G. Fans Thank Colin – Six Tours.' The central figure, wearing a large straw sun-hat, was signing endless autographs, posing for photographs and exchanging friendly talk with young and old in the way that has made him as popular a cricketer as has ever visited Australia.
E.W. Swanton
England beat Australia by an innings and 4 runs, but still lost the series 4–1 and with it the Ashes. It was the first time that Australia had beaten England since the 1964 Ashes series and the first at home since 1958–59. Mike Denness's 188 was the highest Test century by an England captain in Australia and, until Alastair Cook made 235 not out in 2010–11, the highest century by an England batsman in Australia since Wally Hammond's 231 not out in 1936–37. Alan Knott took six catches in the match and made his 200th dismissal in Tests, only the second wicketkeeper to achieve this feat after Godfrey Evans (219).

1974–75 Test Series Averages
source

Annual reviews
 Playfair Cricket Annual 1975
 Wisden Cricketers' Almanack 1975

Further reading
 Peter Arnold, The Illustrated Encyclopaedia of World of Cricket, W.H. Smith, 1985
 Mark Browning, Rod Marsh: A Life in Cricket, Rosenberg Publishing, 2003
 Ian Brayshaw, The Chappell Era, ABC Enterprises, 1984
 Ian Chappell and Ashley Mallett, Hitting Out: The Ian Chappell Story, Orion, 2006
 Colin Cowdrey, M. C. C. The Autobiography of a Cricketer, Coronet Books, 1977
 Bill Frindall, The Wisden Book of Test Cricket 1877–1978, Wisden, 1979
 Colin Firth, Pageant of Cricket, The Macmillan Company of Australia,1987
 Chris Harte, A History of Australian Cricket, Andre Deutsch, 1993
 Ken Kelly and David Lemmon, Cricket Reflections: Five Decades of Cricket Photographs, Heinemann, 1985
 Dennis Lillee, Lillee, My Life in Cricket, Methuen Australia, 1982
 Dennis Lillee, Menace: the Autobiography, Headline Book Publishing, 2003
 Ashley Mallett, Rowdy, Lynton Publications, 1973
 Ashley Mallett, Spin Out, Garry Sparke & Associates, 1977
 Ashley Mallett, One of a Kind: The Doug Walters Story, Orion, 2009
 Rod Marsh, The Gloves of Irony, Pan, 1999
 Adrian McGregor, Greg Chappell, Collins, 1985
 Mark Peel, The Last Roman: A Biography of Colin Cowdrey, Andre Deutsch Ltd, 1999
 Ray Robinson, On Top Down Under, Cassell, 1975
 E.W. Swanton (ed), The Barclays World of Cricket, Collins, 1986
 Huw Turbervill, The Toughest Tour: The Ashes Away Series: 1946 to 2007, Aurum Press Ltd, 2010
 Derek Underwood, Beating the Bat: An Autobiography, S.Paul, 1975
 Bob Willis, Lasting the Pace, Collins, 1985

Video
 Allan Border and David Gower, The Best of the Ashes – 1970–1987, 2 Entertain Video, 1991

References
 Ashley Brown, A Pictorial History of Cricket, Bison Books Ltd, 1988
 Ian Chappell, Austin Robertson and Paul Rigby, Chappelli Has the Last Laugh, Lansdowne Press, 1980
 Patrick Eagar and Graeme Wright, Test Decade 1972/1982, World's Work Ltd, 1982
 Tom Graveney and Norman Miller, The Ten Greatest Test Teams, Sidgewick and Jackson, 1988
 E.W. Swanton, Swanton in Australia with MCC 1946–75, Fontant, 1977
 Alan Synge,  Sins of Omission, The Story of the Test Selectors 1899–1990, Pelham Books, 1990
 Frank Tyson, Test of Nerves, Test series 1974–75 Australia versus England, Manark Pty Ltd, 1975
 Bob Willis and Patrick Murphy, Starting With Grace, A Pictorial Celebration of Cricket 1864–1986, 1986

External links
 CricketArchive tour itinerary

Ashes series
Ashes series
Ashes series
Ashes series
Ashes series
International cricket competitions from 1970–71 to 1975
The Ashes